Kiley Hendriks (born November 4, 1975), better known by his stage name Prevail, is a 4-time Juno Award winning Canadian hip hop artist raised in Victoria, British Columbia and based in Vancouver, British Columbia. Prevail is part of platinum-selling Swollen Members, which consists principally of himself and Mad Child. They have been called "two of the most innovative people in hip-hop". Aside from his extensive catalog with Swollen Members, Prevail released a side project entitled Code Name Scorpion with Abstract Rude and Moka Only in 2001, his first solo EP Baseball Bat and Nails in 2009, and a second solo EP with Ol' City Rocker titled Spasefase in 2012. Prevail has now started a new group in 2016 that goes by the name 'Alpha Omega' teaming up with his nephew Corey Joseph (a.k.a. Neph).

Music
Prevail rarely swears and tends to use an expansive vocabulary. The subject matter of his lyrics is generally quite dark. He often makes references to literature and entertainment.

Solo releases
Baseball Bat & Nails EP - February 10, 2009
Spasefase EP - January 10, 2012

Discography with Swollen Members
Balance - September 28, 1999
Balance: Extra Tracks - November 23, 1999
Balance Re-Release - May 1, 2001
Bad Dreams - November 13, 2001
Monsters in the Closet - November 12, 2002
Heavy - October 27, 2003
Heavy Bonus DVD - November 18, 2003
Black Magic - September 12 2006
Armed to the Teeth - October 27, 2009
Dagger Mouth - March 15, 2011
Beautiful Death Machine - March 19, 2013
Brand New Day - June 16, 2014

Awards and recognition with Swollen Members

Juno Awards
2001 - Best Rap Recording (Balance)
2002 - Best Rap Recording (Bad Dreams)
2003 - Rap Recording of the Year (Monsters in the Closet)
2007 - Rap Recording of the Year (Black Magic)

MuchMusic Video Awards
2002 - MuchVIBE Best Rap Video ("Fuel Injected" feat. Moka Only and directed by Wendy Morgan)
2002 - MuchMusic Best Director ("Fuel Injected" feat. Moka Only and directed by Wendy Morgan)
2002 - MuchMusic VideoFACT Award ("Fuel Injected" feat. Moka Only and directed by Wendy Morgan)
2002 - MuchMusic Best Independent Video ("Fuel Injected" feat. Moka Only and directed by Wendy Morgan)
2003 - MuchVIBE Best Rap Video ("Breath" feat. Nelly Furtado and directed by Todd McFarlane)

References

External links
http://alphaomegaltvr.com/
The Swollen Members official homepage
The Battleaxe Records homepage
Swollen Members official myspace
prevails official myspace

1975 births
Canadian male rappers
20th-century Canadian rappers
Living people
Musicians from Regina, Saskatchewan
Musicians from Vancouver
21st-century Canadian rappers
20th-century Canadian male musicians
21st-century Canadian male musicians